Sangay Lepcha is an Indian politician. He was elected to the Sikkim Legislative Assembly from Yoksam–Tashiding in the 2019 Sikkim Legislative Assembly election as a member of the Sikkim Krantikari Morcha. He is Deputy Speaker of the Sikkim Legislative Assembly.

References

1963 births
Living people
Sikkim Democratic Front politicians
People from Gyalshing district
Sikkim MLAs 2019–2024
Deputy Speakers of the Sikkim Legislative Assembly
Lepcha people